Kerttu Elina Niskanen (born 13 June 1988) is a Finnish cross-country skier. She is a four-time Olympic medalist.

Career
At the FIS Nordic World Ski Championships 2011 in Oslo, her first senior WCH, Niskanen finished eighth in the 10 km classical event. To date, her best individual World Championship results are 4th places in the skiathlon and 30 km classical in the FIS Nordic World Ski Championships 2015 in Falun.

At the 2014 Winter Olympics in Sochi, she won two silver medals as a member of team Finland: in 4 × 5 km relay and in team sprint. She also finished fourth in 30 km freestyle.

Niskanen also has two bronze medals from World Championship 4 x 5 km relays in 2015 and 2017. She has won three World Cup competitions and has been on the podium ten times in total. Her best result in the Tour de Ski is 5th, which she achieved three times in 2014, 2016, and 2022.

She was forced to sit out the 2021 World Championships after a fracture was discovered in her left fibula after a World Cup race in Falun, Sweden, in January 2021. Despite the sudden, sharp pain from the fracture, Niskanen finished the race in 12th place. This was her final race of the season.

During the 2021/22 season, Niskanen took her first win and podium in three years when she won the 10 km classical Stage World Cup race in Lenzerheide, Switzerland. Following the win, she became the Tour de Ski leader for the first time in her career. Niskanen eventually finished fifth in the tournament.

At the 2022 Beijing Olympics, Niskanen won her first individual Olympic medal, a silver in the 10 km classical event, losing the gold medal to Therese Johaug of Norway by only 0.4 seconds. She also placed fourth in the skiathlon, which was already her fourth 4th-place finish in individual Olympic or World Championship competitions. The team events also resulted in fourth place for Niskanen; she skied the 3rd leg in the 4 x 5 km relay and the first, third, and fifth legs of the team sprint. In both events, Finland was a strong medal contender and missed out on medals by only a couple of seconds.

In the last event of the Olympics, the 30 km freestyle held in grueling, windy conditions, Niskanen won her second individual medal, this time a bronze. For most of the race, Niskanen, whose stronger style is often considered classic, skied in fourth place at the front of a chase group. In the final kilometre, however, Niskanen overtook Ebba Andersson of Sweden, who at 25 km had been half a minute ahead of her, seizing the bronze as the fastest of the chasers.

Kerttu Niskanen's younger brother Iivo is also a cross-country skier and three-time Olympic champion. On 29 December 2021, the siblings made history as they won the 10 and 15 km World Cup events in Lenzerheide only hours apart. At the finale of the 2021/22 season, they shared a World Cup podium for the first time, having taken part in the mixed relay event where Finland placed second. Between them, the Niskanen siblings have won nine Olympic and five World Championship medals.

Cross-country skiing results
All results are sourced from the International Ski Federation (FIS).

Olympic Games
4 medals – (3 silver, 1 bronze)

World Championships
2 medals – (2 bronze)

World Cup

Season standings

Individual podiums
 5 victories – (3 , 2 ) 
 16 podiums – (8 , 8 )

Team podiums
 7 podiums – (7 )

See also
List of Olympic medalist families

References

External links

1988 births
Living people
Finnish female cross-country skiers
Sportspeople from Oulu
Cross-country skiers at the 2014 Winter Olympics
Cross-country skiers at the 2018 Winter Olympics
Cross-country skiers at the 2022 Winter Olympics
Olympic cross-country skiers of Finland
Medalists at the 2014 Winter Olympics
Medalists at the 2022 Winter Olympics
Olympic medalists in cross-country skiing
Olympic silver medalists for Finland
Olympic bronze medalists for Finland
FIS Nordic World Ski Championships medalists in cross-country skiing
Tour de Ski skiers
21st-century Finnish women